Hampden is a tiny city in Ramsey County, North Dakota, United States, which was founded in 1903. The population was 29 at the 2020 census.

Geography

Demographics

2010 census
As of the census of 2010, there were 48 people, 26 households, and 11 families residing in the city. The racial makeup of the city was 97.9% White and 2.1% from two or more races.

There were 26 households, of which 15.4% had children under the age of 18 living with them, 34.6% were married couples living together, 7.7% had a male householder with no wife present, and 57.7% were non-families. 53.8% of all households were made up of individuals, and 38.4% had someone living alone who was 65 years of age or older. The average household size was 1.85 and the average family size was 2.55.

The median age in the city was 53.5 years. 16.7% of residents were under the age of 18; 4.2% were between the ages of 18 and 24; 12.6% were from 25 to 44; 33.4% were from 45 to 64; and 33.3% were 65 years of age or older. The gender makeup of the city was 45.8% male and 54.2% female.

2000 census
As of the census of 2000, there were 60 people, 34 households, and 14 families residing in the city. The population density was 348.9 people per square mile (136.3/km2). There were 53 housing units at an average density of 308.2 per square mile (120.4/km2). The racial makeup of the city was 100.00% White. Mayor Donald Steeves.

There were 34 households, out of which 11.8% had children under the age of 18 living with them, 41.2% were married couples living together, and 58.8% were non-families. 55.9% of all households were made up of individuals, and 26.5% had someone living alone who was 65 years of age or older. The average household size was 1.76 and the average family size was 2.71.

In the city, the population was spread out, with 15.0% under the age of 18, 6.7% from 18 to 24, 31.7% from 25 to 44, 16.7% from 45 to 64, and 30.0% who were 65 years of age or older. The median age was 42 years. For every 100 females, there were 122.2 males. For every 100 females age 18 and over, there were 121.7 males.

The median income for a household in the city was $31,250, and the median income for a family was $54,375. Males had a median income of $23,750 versus $23,750 for females. The per capita income for the city was $20,860. There were no families and 11.5% of the population living below the poverty line, including no under eighteens and none of those over 64.

External links
 Hampden, North Dakota
 Hampden, North Dakota 58338
 Hampden diamond jubilee 1979 from the Digital Horizons website

References

Cities in North Dakota
Cities in Ramsey County, North Dakota
Populated places established in 1903
1903 establishments in North Dakota